Manuel Cedeño de Poveda (c. 1800 – c. 1860) was Mayor of Ponce, Puerto Rico, from January 1851 to 23 April 1851.

See also

 List of Puerto Ricans
 List of mayors of Ponce, Puerto Rico

Notes

References

Mayors of Ponce, Puerto Rico
1800s births
1860s deaths
Year of birth uncertain
Year of death uncertain